Parkside Candy Shoppe and Factory is a historic commercial and industrial complex located in the University Heights neighborhood of Buffalo, Erie County, New York. It consists of a two-story brick and stone commercial Candy Shoppe building (1925-1927), with an attached two-story brick and tile daylight factory building, erected in two stages (1925-1927; 1928).  Also on the property is a contributing one-story, three-bay frame garage (1928).

It was listed on the National Register of Historic Places in 2015.

References

External links
Parkside Candy website

Commercial buildings on the National Register of Historic Places in New York (state)
Industrial buildings and structures on the National Register of Historic Places in New York (state)
Commercial buildings completed in 1925
Industrial buildings completed in 1925
Buildings and structures in Buffalo, New York
National Register of Historic Places in Buffalo, New York
1925 establishments in New York (state)
Confectionery industry